Parker Ranch is a working cattle ranch on the Island of Hawaii in the U.S. state of Hawaii, now run by a charitable trust.

History
The ranch was founded in 1847 and is one of the oldest ranches in the United States, pre-dating many mainland ranches in Texas and other southwestern states by more than 30 years.

A cowboy on the ranch is called a paniolo (Hawaiian language pronunciation of ), since the first cowboys were Spanish-speaking and came from Mexico. The Hawaiian language does not have the "s" sound.

During World War II, part of the ranch was used as a United States Marine Corps training base called Camp Tarawa. The Second and Fifth Marine Divisions conducted training maneuvers there in preparation for the assault of Iwo Jima.

The founder of the ranch was John Palmer Parker who assisted Kamehameha I in ridding the island of feral bulls and was granted land on which he established the ranch. From 1899 to 1937 it was managed by Alfred Wellington Carter (1867–1949).
The last owner of the ranch, the actor Richard Smart, died in 1992. Since then the Ranch has been governed by the Parker Ranch Foundation Trust.

Two of the ranch's historic homes, Puuopelu and Mana Hale, are open for free self guided tours at 66-1304 Mamalahoa Highway about one mile outside of Waimea town.  This is also the location of the Corporate Headquarters.

The Parker Ranch Arena and a racetrack are located off the Hawaii Belt Road at coordinates . The Ranch holds its annual July 4 Rodeo and Horses races at this Historic location.

The Mauna Kea Beach Hotel, was developed and constructed by Laurance S. Rockefeller, on land purchased from Parker Ranch.

Paniolo Cattle Company

Following a successful grass-fed beef trial on Hawaii Island, Parker Ranch and Ulupono Initiative announced the launch of the Paniolo Cattle Company, a joint venture aimed at statewide local beef production in March 2014. Paniolo Cattle Company began with 1,400 head of cattle to be raised at Parker Ranch. This represented the largest commitment of grass-fed beef by a single ranch in the state and increased the supply of grass-fed steers to the market by nearly 35 percent.  The Paniolo Cattle Company grass fed beef can be found in island Safeway stores.

2020

According to President and CEO Dutch Kuyper, due to the COVID-19 pandemic Parker Ranch canceled their annual 4 July rodeo in 2020. They donated 6,500 pounds of grass-fed, ground beef to needy Hawaiians in Waimea. The Food Basket food bank gives it away at various locations in their Ohana Drops.

Family tree

References

Further reading

 
 Dr. Billy Bergin. Loyal to the Land: The Legendary Parker Ranch, 750–1950. University of Hawai‘i Press. .
 Dr. Billy Bergin. Loyal to the Land: The Legendary Parker Ranch, 1950–1970. Volume 2: The Senior Stewards. University of Hawai‘i Press. .

External links

 
 Paniolo Cattle Company Website
 Parker Ranch Foundation Trust

Buildings and structures in Hawaii County, Hawaii
Ranches in Hawaii
Historic house museums in Hawaii
Museums in Hawaii County, Hawaii
Rural history museums in Hawaii
1847 establishments in Hawaii